Hong Wenwen (born August 22, 1986 in Wuhan, Hubei) is a female Chinese swimmer, who competed for Team China at the 2008 Summer Olympics.

Major achievements
2006 Asian Championships - 1st 4×100 m medley relay, 2nd 100 m fly;
2006/2007 National Championships - 2nd 100 m fly, 3rd 50 m/100 m fly;
2006 National Winter Championships - 1st 50 m/100 m fly

References
http://2008teamchina.olympic.cn/index.php/personview/personsen/5349

1986 births
Living people
Chinese female butterfly swimmers
Swimmers from Wuhan
Olympic swimmers of China
Universiade medalists in swimming
Universiade silver medalists for China
Universiade bronze medalists for China
Swimmers at the 2008 Summer Olympics
Medalists at the 2009 Summer Universiade
21st-century Chinese women